Kevin Kehoe (born 1991 in Bahana, County Carlow) is an Irish athlete. He plays hurling with his local club St Mullin's and has been a member of the senior Carlow county hurling team since 2011.

References

1991 births
Living people
Carlow inter-county hurlers
Hurling goalkeepers
St Mullin's hurlers